Mădălina-Victorița Gojnea (born 23 August 1987) is a former Romanian tennis player.

On 4 July 2011, she reached her highest WTA singles ranking of 149 whilst her best doubles ranking was 191 on 9 July 2007.

In 2013, only 25 years old, she announced her retirement due to multiple injuries.

She played for the Romania Fed Cup team in 2006 and 2007 and accumulated a win-loss record of 8–6 (singles: 7–1) in Fed Cup competitions.

In May 2015, after almost two years of absence from the pro circuit, Mădălina made her comeback to playing tennis at the Pamira Open, an ITF event held in Sibiu. Her last match on the circuit took place in August of the same year.

Junior career

Junior Grand Slam finals

Girls' singles

Girls' doubles

Senior career

ITF finals

Singles: 17 (12–5)

Doubles: 20 (11–9)

References

External links

 
 
 

1987 births
Living people
Sportspeople from Ploiești
Romanian female tennis players